Karol Adam Karski (born 13 May 1966 in Warsaw) is a Polish politician, Quaestor of the European Parliament, and a former Vice-Minister of Foreign Affairs. He holds a Doctor of Law degree from the University of Warsaw. Karski has taught at the University of Warsaw, the Warsaw University of Humanities, and the Academy of Economics in Białystok. He was elected to the Sejm on 25 September 2005 and on 21 October 2007 in 19 Warsaw district as a candidate from the Law and Justice list.

See also
Members of Polish Sejm 2005-2007

External links
Karol Karski - parliamentary page - includes declarations of interest, voting record, and transcripts of speeches.

1966 births
Living people
Lawyers from Warsaw
Politicians from Warsaw
Members of the Polish Sejm 2005–2007
Law and Justice politicians
MEPs for Poland 2014–2019
Members of the Polish Sejm 2007–2011
MEPs for Poland 2019–2024